Portezuelo is a Chilean town and commune located in the Itata Province, Ñuble Region.

Demographics
Of these, 1,750 (32%) lived in urban areas and 3,720 (68%) in rural areas. The population fell by 8.4% (500 persons) between the 1992 and 2002 censuses.

Localities 

 Quitento

Administration
As a commune, Portezuelo is a third-level administrative division of Chile administered by a communal council, headed by an alcalde who is directly elected every four years. The 2008-2012 alcalde is Modesto Sepúlveda Andrade (PDC). The communal council has the following members:
 Paulina Zamudio (Ind./Pro-PDC)
 Daniel Pastén (UDI)
 Pedro Fernández (Ind./PDC)
 Flavio Barrientos (Ind./RN)
 Marcelo Cortés (PRI)
 Melitón Aravena (PDC)

Within the electoral divisions of Chile, Portezuel belongs to the 42nd electoral district and 12th senatorial constituency.

See also
 List of towns in Chile

References

External links
  Municipality of Portezuelo

Communes of Chile
Populated places in Itata Province